Waltraud Isoldé Elchlepp (born 20 May 1942) is a German protest song singer under the pseudonym Dominique, and an operatic mezzo-soprano and soprano who appeared at major German opera houses and festivals including the Bayreuth Festival. She took part in world premieres such as Reimann's Das Schloß and Bernarda Albas Haus at the Bavarian State Opera. Besides the standard repertoire, she appeared in roles such as Othmar Schoeck's Penthesilea at the Staatsoper Hannover.

Life and career 
Elchlepp was born in Strasbourg (France, at the time annexed to Germany by the Third Reich), grew up in Karlsruhe and went to college in Brighton, England. Her father died during the Second World War, and her mother moved to Munich with her and her older sister. At the request of her mother, Elchlepp first studied fashion graphic design in Munich, and simultaneously undertook voice training. An Austrian producer became aware of her, and thus Elchlepp, who called herself Dominique as a protest singer, signed her first record contract in 1965. She began with hits and scored her first success with the protest song "Der ewige Soldat", based on "The Universal Soldier" by Buffy Sainte-Marie/Donovan, with German lyrics by Max Colpet. Further singles followed and also appeared on her LP Krieg im Frieden. She recorded several songs by Bob Dylan, Udo Westgard, and Pete Seeger.

She trained at the opera studio of the Bavarian State Opera in Munich, now under the name Isoldé Elchlepp. She appeared in small roles at the Bavarian State Opera, such as Kate Pinkerton in Puccini's Madama Butterfly in 1973 and in Der Rosenkavalier by Richard Strauss in 1975. From 1975 to 1982, she was a member of the Theater Bremen, then from 1982 to 1988 at the Hessisches Staatstheater Wiesbaden, moving to the Staatsoper Hannover. Her roles included Venus in Wagner's Tannhäuser, Brünnhilde in Der Ring des Nibelungen, Kundry in Parsifal, Azucena in Verdi's Il trovatore, Santuzza in Mascagni's Cavalleria Rusticana, Marie in Alban Berg's Wozzeck and Hekabe in Aribert Reimann's Troades, also works by Haydn, Mozart and Orff.

She performed at the Bayreuth Festival, in 1985 and 1986 as Rossweiße in Die Walküre, and in 1993 as Ortrud in Lohengrin. In 1992, she sang the role of the landlady at the world premiere of Reimann's Das Schloß, and in 2000, she appeared as La Poncia in the premiere of the composer's Bernarda Albas Haus, both at the Bavarian State Opera. In 1999, she appeared in the title role of Othmar Schoeck's Penthesilea at the Staatsoper Hannover, conducted by Andreas Delfs; a reviewer noted her stage presence, and how she sang the difficult part without showing how difficult it is.

She also appeared in concert, for example in the performance of Schönberg' Gurre-Lieder for the opening of the new Konzerthaus Freiburg in Freiburg on 28 June 1996.

Discography 
As Isoldé Elchlepp

 Richard Strauss: Der Rosenkavalier. Gesamtaufnahme. Bayerisches Staatsorchester, Carlos Kleiber (conductor). Orfeo D'Or C581083D, 2008 (1973 recording)
 Hans Zender: Stephen Climax. Gesamtaufnahme. Choeurs & Orchestre du Théâtre Royal de la Monnaie (Brüssel), Sylvain Cambreling (conductor). Academy ACA 8507-2, 1993
 Arnold Schoenberg: Gurre-Lieder. Philharmonisches Orchester Freiburg, Johannes Fritzsch (conductor). Rombach, Freiburg 1997
 Aribert Reimann: Das Schloß. Complete recording (as Wirtin). Bayerisches Staatsorchester, Michael Boder (conductor). Wergo WER 6614-2, 1997

As Dominique

Singles (Polydor)

 52 607 A Der ewige Soldat – 52 607 B Aber ich wart auf dich – 1966
 52 695 A Ist das die Welt, die wir mal erben sollen? – 52 695 B Wie es früher war – 1966
 52 723 A Und was wird morgen sein? – 52 723 B Der Brief von drüben – 1966
 52 836 A Ich hab in der Liebe kein Glück – 52 836 B Und wieder steht der Sonntag vor der Tür – 1967
 53 023 A Tausend Straßen – 53 023 B Du lachst mich aus – 1968

Album

 Dominique – Krieg im Frieden – Polydor/Stern-musik Nr. 249078
 Der ewige Soldat – Saint Marie/Donovan/Colpet
 Krieg im Land – Stockey/Yarrow/Bader
 Starfighter-Ballade – Westgard/Bader
 Schlaf ein – Angelina – Dylan/Bader
 Das Schlüsselkind – Westgard/Bader
 Sag' mir, wo die Blumen sind – Seeger/Colpet
 Der Brief von drüben – Westgard/Bader
 Zeig mir eine Insel – Westgard/Colpet/Rotter
 Man geht nicht mehr ohne Doppelkinn Müller/Prottel
 Die Antwort weiß ganz allein der Wind – Dylan/Bradtke
 Sergeant Marie – Westgard/Bader
 Ist das die Welt, die wir mal erben sollen – Scharfenberger/Colpet

References

External links 
 
 Isoldé Elchlepp Bayerisches Musiker Lexikon Online by University of Munich
 Isoldé Elchlepp Operissimo
 
 Beat Fräuleins (Teil 1) rockzirkus.de 7 January 2009
 Dominique  readysteadygirls.eu

 Other VIAF entries: 48918157, 79751016

German operatic mezzo-sopranos
Protest songs
1942 births
Living people
Musicians from Strasbourg
20th-century German women opera singers